Elissalde, also spelled Élissalde, is a surname. Notable people with the surname include:

Jean-Baptiste Élissalde (born 1977), French rugby player
Jean-Pierre Élissalde (born 1953), French rugby coach, father of Jean-Baptiste
Rémi Elissalde (born 1991), French footballer

Basque-language surnames